Gun Harbor is a bay located on Stillwater Reservoir in Herkimer County, New York. Gun Harbor Brook enters Stillwater Reservoir in Gun Harbor.

References

Landforms of Herkimer County, New York